Saint-Jean-des-Mauvrets is a former commune in the Maine-et-Loire département in western France. On 15 December 2016, it was merged into the new commune Les Garennes sur Loire.

See also
Communes of the Maine-et-Loire department

References

Saintjeandesmauvrets